All Aussie Adventures, also known as Russell Coight's All Aussie Adventures, is an Australian mockumentary television series that parodies the travel-adventure genre. Comedian  Glenn Robbins plays Russell Coight, a survival and wildlife expert who charts his disastrous travels through Australia, spreading misinformation and causing accidents. The series originally ran on Network Ten from 5 August 2001 to 29 September 2002. There was also a 14 November 2004 telemovie, Russell Coight's Celebrity Challenge, which featured minor (fictional) celebrities joining Coight in the outback.

It was announced on 4 November 2016 that the show would return for a third series after fifteen years off the air, which premiered on 5 August 2018.

Series overview

Genre 

The series parodies the adventure genre, which included the travels of the Leyland Brothers, The Bush Tucker Man, Malcolm Douglas, Steve Irwin, Ben Cropp, Harry Butler and Alby Mangels. More recent programs include Australian 4wd action and What’s Up Downunder. In these programs the host travels the wilderness meeting local people and providing insight into the flora and fauna of the country, in the process causing environmental damage by using large quantities of diesel fuel and erosion from driving through pristine creeks and dirt tracks.

The narration (typically provided by the host) often verges on hyperbole.

Format

Episodes of All Aussie Adventures generally follow a similar format. Coight greets the audience and explains his latest reason for outback travel – often to help out a "mate". He ends each introduction with the tagline "So what are we waiting for, let's get cracking on another All Aussie Adventure".

Russell Coight
The series is presented as if Russell Coight were a real person, eschewing screen credit for his portrayer Glenn Robbins. The only mention of Robbins is at the end of the credits, when he is thanked "for his directorial assistance".

Perhaps the kindest description of Russell Coight is "accident-prone" – if something can go wrong for him, it will. Coight is a naturally outgoing man and comfortable in front of the camera, so is never shy in revealing private aspects of his personality (he even showers in front of the camera). Over the series the audience discovers various hints to his character, such as a glimpse of his card for the local adult video store.

Russell Coight identifies himself as an 'outback man', who strongly endorses the ways of the outback, as opposed to the ways of urban life. When Russell finds numerous tourists stuck on the outback road, he hastily refers to them as "city slickers" before he tries to help them, albeit unsuccessfully. He also perceives these "city slickers" as being overly affluent, and who waste their money on "high-tech gadgets" and five-star hotels, along with comparing such things to his own outback lifestyle, which includes making his own chair and bathing in a freshwater billabong.

His sister Meredith – who is never seen – is credited for everything from being a crocodile tamer to a stunt coordinator. In one episode, "Daintree", she is heard singing dreamily a somewhat dubious song, "Daintree", from her album Daintree, on the Daintree label.

Following the success of the first series, comedian and talk show host Rove McManus interviewed Russell Coight, who provided information on his fictional background.

"Wallaby Jack", a similar character from The Late Show, is a precursor to Coight. Tom Gleisner, a writer for both series, points this out in The Late Show DVD audio commentary.

Parody aspects

Common gags 
Much of the humour of All Aussie Adventures is contained in the sight gags. Tents collapse, camp fires rage out of control, cars roll away and Coight trips and falls painfully.
 
Coight regularly suffers from flatulence, especially when he is sitting in a quiet idyllic pool, whereupon bubbles inevitably rise to the surface. When bending over, he will occasionally pass wind.

Coight is fond of saving indigenous wildlife and preserving historical Australian sites. However, due to Coight's clumsiness and/or inattentiveness he often unintentionally destroys the animal or location.

Coight often attempts to make jokes with his friends during the programs. Unfortunately, most of these fall flat. He presents himself as a man with "mates" all around Australia, whom he likes to bring into his shows. These "mates" usually avoid him, or barely know him, but he seems oblivious to any embarrassment this should cause him on air.

In one episode an Indigenous Australian is educating Coight on finding bush tucker. Coight attempts to tell the joke about being on a "seafood diet...I see food and I eat it", achieving absolutely no reaction. The guest is as clueless as Coight, rejecting all Coight's ideas on bush tucker, and telling Coight that the outback is full of wild bananas, out of season at the time.

Coight also claims to be one of the greatest birdcallers in the business with over 100 different bird calls in his repertoire (most of which sound identical). According to Coight "once you get your finger in the right position and your tongue doing the same..... the rest is easy". He then demonstrates a bird call but his flatulence interrupts it. He tries to downplay this by suggesting the flatus was "the reply call of an injured bird".

Stock footage 
Another source of humour is the frequent use of stock footage in incongruous situations. The most well-known example of this is the "handshaking shot".

When Coight meets a new character the program will cut to a closeup shot of their handshake. As a gag, this is clearly a shot taken at a different time with different people. When Coight shakes hands with an indigenous Australian, the closeup will show two white hands. When he shakes hands with a white Australian, the closeup will show a black and a white hand. This serves to highlight the artificial and constructed nature of this sort of television series banter.

Scenery footage is often re-used in the different episodes. Footage obviously shot in Victoria will be shown when Coight is supposedly far into the Northern Territory.

Footage of the Toyota Land Cruiser used in the show is often reused, meaning the number plate often changes throughout the episode. Beginning in Season 3, the original vehicle is replaced by a Land Rover Defender.

Episodes

Season 1 (2001)

Season 2 (2002)

Television movie (2004)

Season 3 (2018) 

On 4 November 2016, All Aussie Adventures was renewed for a third season and was scheduled to return in 2017 after 15 years off screen. In August 2017, the series was rescheduled to air in 2018. The series premiered on 5 August 2018. The final two episodes aired on 9 September 2018, being broadcast consecutively.

Viewership

References

External links
 Official Russell Coight web site.
 
 All Aussie Adventures at Ten Play
All Aussie Adventures at the National Film and Sound Archive
 All Aussie Adventures at Screen Australia

Australian comedy television series
Network 10 original programming
Adventure travel
Australian mockumentary television series
2001 Australian television series debuts
2002 Australian television series endings
2018 Australian television series debuts
Australian television series revived after cancellation